Kofi Laing (1946 – 16 September 2021), also known as Kohwe, was a Ghanaian actor and comedian.

Filmography 
Akan Drama
District Colonial Court
Kaneshie Odorkor

Death 
Kohwe died after suffering from stroke in his residence at Accra.

References 

1946 births
2021 deaths
Ghanaian male film actors
20th-century Ghanaian male actors
21st-century Ghanaian male actors